La Madeleine may refer to:

Places

Canada
 Magdalen Islands (French: Les Îles de la Madeleine), an archipelago in the Gulf of Saint Lawrence
 Urban agglomeration of Les Îles-de-la-Madeleine, Quebec, Canada
 Les Îles-de-la-Madeleine, Quebec, one of the two municipalities forming the urban agglomeration
 Cap-de-la-Madeleine, a former city in Quebec, Canada at the confluence of the Saint-Maurice River and the St. Lawrence River

France
 La Madeleine (Laneuville-devant-Nancy), a former commune that is now a part of Laneuveville-devant-Nancy in the Meurthe-et-Moselle département
 La Madeleine, Manche, a village in Normandy
 La Madeleine, Nord, a town in the Nord département
 La Madeleine-de-Nonancourt, in the Eure département 
 La Madeleine-Villefrouin, in the Loir-et-Cher département
 La Madeleine-Bouvet, in the Orne département 
 La Madeleine-sur-Loing, in the Seine-et-Marne département
 Lamadeleine-Val-des-Anges, a commune in the Territoire de Belfort département
 Cizay-la-Madeleine, a commune in the Maine-et-Loire department
 Collonge-la-Madeleine, a commune in the Saône-et-Loire department
 La Madeleine, a parish in Faycelles in the Lot département; see Liberty Tree
 La Madeleine, a village in Guérande in the Loire-Atlantique département

Luxembourg
 Lamadelaine, a town in the commune of Pétange
 Lamadelaine railway station

Senegal
 Îles de la Madeleine (Senegal), uninhabited islands and national park off the shore of Dakar

Churches
 La Madeleine, Paris, a church in Paris
 Église de la Madeleine (Besançon), Doube département, France

Other uses
 La Madeleine (restaurant chain), a U.S.-based restaurant chain
 Madeleine (river), a river in the Territoire de Belfort département, France
 Abri de la Madeleine, a prehistoric shelter site in Tursac, Dordogne, France
 Boulevard de la Madeleine, one of the four 'grands boulevards' in Paris, France
 Château de la Madeleine, a castle located in the town of Chevreuse, France, in the  département of Yvelines
 Col de la Madeleine, a high mountain pass in the Alps in the department of Savoie
 HMCS Cap de la Madeleine (K663), a River class frigate that served in the Royal Canadian Navy from 1944 to 1945
 Magdalene with the Smoking Flame (French: La Madeleine à la veilleuse), a c.1640, a painting by Georges de La Tour
 Ouvrage de la Madeleine, a former name for Ouvrage Rimplas, a work of the Maginot Line's Alpine extension

See also
 Îles de la Madeleine (disambiguation)
 Madeleine (disambiguation)
 Madelaine